Long Arm of the Godfather is a 1972 Italian crime film directed by Nardo Bonomi and starring Adolfo Celi.

Cast
 Adolfo Celi - Don Carmelo
 Peter Lee Lawrence - Vincenzo
 Erika Blanc - Sabina
 Kim Dimon
 Henriette Kok
 Riccardo Petrazzi - Don Carmelo Henchman
 Claudio Ruffini - Tom
 Piera Moretti
 Attilio Pelegatti
 Pietro Torrisi - Gallo
 Bruno Boschetti

References

External links

1972 films
Italian crime drama films
1970s Italian-language films
1972 crime films
Mafia films
1970s Italian films